The Dark Divide is a 2020 feature film based on the memoir Where Bigfoot Walks: Crossing the Dark Divide by Robert Michael Pyle.

Plot 
Pyle, a lepidopterist, sets out on a 30-day trek through the Gifford Pinchot National Forest to document butterflies and moths following the traumatic death of his wife from cancer. An inexperienced hiker, Pyle encounters challenges including frightening wildlife and getting lost in a cave. When he completes the hike, taking far more days than he had expected to, he leaves the wilderness with a sense of accomplishment.

Cast 
 David Cross as Robert Michael Pyle
 Debra Messing as Thea Linnea Pyle
 Cameron Esposito as Monty
 Gary Farmer as Densmore
 Kimberly Guerrero as Teresa
 Patterson Hood as Joe
 David Koechner as Shayne
 Peyton Dilweg as Maggie
 Dyami Thomas as Billy
 Olivia Ritchie as Amie
 Brian Adrian Koch as Joey

Production 
The movie was filmed almost entirely on location in the places the action was set. Director Tom Putnam credited his background as a documentary film director for making this feasible. He said, "Because of my documentary background, we were able to construct a film that used a small crew to reach locations larger films could never go to...If you see David [Cross] hanging off a cliff, braving a thunderstorm, or struggling in freezing water, that's really him. When you see lava tunnels deep underground, that's where we shot."

Release 
The film was released virtually on September 18, 2020, due to the COVID-19 pandemic. The film's website noted that some of the film's proceeds would be donated to "protect wildlife and wild places."

Reception 
Writing for The Hollywood Reporter, critic Frank Scheck called the film "awfully entertaining" and praised Cross's "touching and funnily self-effacing turn." The Austin Chronicles Richard Whittaker praised the film as "a beautiful, quiet, lyrical, funny wilderness trip, a meditation on loss and picking up the pieces, and the most perfectly poignant performance of David Cross' acting career."

References

External links
 
 

2020 films
American comedy-drama films
Films set in Washington (state)
2020s English-language films
2020s American films